Peter John Hilton (7 April 19236 November 2010) was a British mathematician, noted for his contributions to homotopy theory and for code-breaking during World War II.

Early life
He was born in Brondesbury, London, the son Mortimer Jacob Hilton, a Jewish physician who was in general practice in Peckham, and his wife Elizabeth Amelia Freedman, and was brought up in Kilburn. The physiologist Sidney Montague Hilton (1921–2011) of the University of Birmingham Medical School was his elder brother.

Hilton was educated at St Paul's School, London. He went to The Queen's College, Oxford in 1940 to read mathematics, on an open scholarship, where the mathematics tutor was Ughtred Haslam-Jones.

Bletchley Park
A wartime undergraduate in wartime Oxford, on a shortened course, Hilton was obliged to train with the Royal Artillery, and faced scheduled conscription in summer 1942. After four terms, he took the advice of his tutor, and followed up a civil service recruitment contact. He had an interview for mathematicians with knowledge of German, and was offered a position in the Foreign Office without being told the nature of the work. The team was, in fact, recruiting on behalf of the Government Code and Cypher School. Aged 18, he arrived at the codebreaking station Bletchley Park on 12 January 1942.

Hilton worked with several of the Bletchley Park deciphering groups. He was initially assigned to Naval Enigma in Hut 8. Hilton commented on his experience working with Alan Turing, whom he knew well for the last 12 years of his life, in his "Reminiscences of Bletchley Park" from A Century of Mathematics in America: Hilton echoed similar thoughts in the Nova PBS documentary Decoding Nazi Secrets.

In late 1942, Hilton transferred to work on German teleprinter ciphers. A special section known as the "Testery" had been formed in July 1942 to work on one such cipher, codenamed "Tunny", and Hilton was one of the early members of the group. His role was to devise ways to deal with changes in Tunny, and to liaise with another section working on Tunny, the "Newmanry", which complemented the hand-methods of the Testery with specialised codebreaking machinery. Hilton has been counted as a member of the Newmanry, possibly on a part-time basis.

Recreational 
A convivial pub drinker at Bletchley Park, Hilton also spent time with Turing working on chess problems and palindromes. He there constructed a 51-letter palindrome: "Doc note, I dissent. A fast never prevents a fatness. I diet on cod." He did not use paper or pencil while composing it, but lay on his bed, eyes closed, and assembled it mentally over one night. It took him five hours.

Mathematics

Hilton obtained his DPhil in 1949 from Oxford University under the supervision of John Henry Whitehead. His dissertation was "Calculation of the homotopy groups of -polyhedra". His principal research interests were in algebraic topology, homological algebra, categorical algebra and mathematics education. He published 15 books and over 600 articles in these areas, some jointly with colleagues. Hilton's theorem (1955) is on the homotopy groups of a wedge of spheres. It addresses an issue that comes up in the theory of "homotopy operations".

Turing, at the Victoria University of Manchester, in 1948 invited Hilton to see the Manchester Mark 1 machine. Around 1950, Hilton took a position at the university maths department. He was there in 1949, when Turing engaged in a discussion that introduced him to the word problem for groups. Hilton worked with Walter Lederman. Another colleague there was Hugh Dowker, who in 1951 drew his attention to the Serre spectral sequence.

In 1952 Hilton moved to DPMMS in Cambridge, England, where he ran a topology seminar attended by John Frank Adams, Michael Atiyah, David B. A. Epstein, Terry Wall and Christopher Zeeman. Via Hilton, Atiyah became aware of Jean-Pierre Serre's coherent sheaf proof of the Riemann–Roch theorem for curves, and found his first research direction in sheaf methods for ruled surfaces.

In 1955 Hilton started work with Beno Eckmann on what became known as Eckmann-Hilton duality for the homotopy category. Through Eckmann he became editor of the Ergebnisse der Mathematik und ihrer Grenzgebiete, a position he held from 1964 to 1983.

Hilton returned to Manchester as Professor, in 1956. In 1958, he became the Mason Professor of Pure Mathematics at the University of Birmingham. He moved to the United States in 1962 to be Professor of Mathematics at Cornell University, a post he held until 1971. From 1971 to 1973, he held a joint appointment as Fellow of the Battelle Seattle Research Center and Professor of Mathematics at the University of Washington. On 1 September 1972, he was appointed Louis D. Beaumont University Professor at Case Western Reserve University; on 1 September 1973, he took up the appointment. In 1982, he was appointed Distinguished Professor of Mathematics at Binghamton University, becoming Emeritus in 2003. Latterly he spent each spring semester as Distinguished Professor of Mathematics at the University of Central Florida.

Hilton is featured in the book Mathematical People.

Death and family
Peter Hilton died on  6 November 2010 in Binghamton, New York, at age 87. He left behind his wife, Margaret Mostyn (born 1925), whom he married in 1949, and their two sons, who were adopted. Margaret, a schoolteacher, had an acting career as Margaret Hilton in the US, in summer stock theatre. She also played television roles. She died in Seattle in 2020.

In popular culture
Hilton is portrayed by actor Matthew Beard in the 2014 film The Imitation Game, which tells the tale of Alan Turing and the cracking of Nazi Germany's Enigma code.

Academic positions
 Lecturer at University of Cambridge, 1952–55
 Senior Lecturer at University of Manchester, England, 1956–58
 Mason Professor of Pure Mathematics, University of Birmingham, England, 1958–62
 Visiting Professor at the Eidgenössische Technische Hochschule at Zürich, ETH Zurich, 1966–67, 1981–82, 1988–89
 Visiting Professor at the Courant Institute of Mathematical Sciences, New York University, 1967–68
 Visiting Professor at the Universitat Autònoma de Barcelona, Autonomous University of Barcelona, 1989
 Professeur invité, University of Lausanne, in 1996

Honours
 Silver Medal, University of Helsinki, 1975
 Doctor of Humanities (hon. causa), N. University of Michigan, 1977
 Corresponding Member, Brazilian Academy of Sciences, 1979
 Doctor of Science (hon. causa), Memorial University of Newfoundland, 1983
 Doctor of Science (hon. causa), Autonomous University of Barcelona, 1989
 In August 1983, an international conference on algebraic topology was held, under the auspices of the Canadian Mathematical Society, to mark Hilton's 60th Birthday. Professor Hilton was presented with a Festschrift of papers dedicated to him (London Mathematical Society Lecture Notes, Volume 86, 1983). The American Mathematical Society has published the proceedings under the title ‘Conference on Algebraic Topology in Honor of Peter Hilton’
 Hilton was selected in October 1992, to deliver the invited lecture at the ‘Georges de Rham’ day at the University of Lausanne.
 An International Conference was held in Montreal in May 1993, to mark the 70th birthday of Hilton. The proceedings were published as The Hilton Symposium, CRM Proceedings and Lecture Notes, Volume 6, American Mathematical Society (1994), edited by Guido Mislin.
 In 1994, Hilton was the Mahler Lecturer of the Australian Mathematical Society.
 In the summers of 2001 and 2002, Hilton was Visiting Erskine Fellow at the University of Canterbury, Christchurch, New Zealand.
 In winter term of 2005 Hilton received an appointment as Courtesy Faculty in the College of Arts and Sciences at University of South Florida.

Hilton's former PhD students
According to the Mathematics Genealogy Project site, Hilton supervised at least 27 doctoral students, including Paul Kainen at Cornell University.

Bibliography

 Peter J. Hilton, An introduction to homotopy theory, Cambridge Tracts in Mathematics and Mathematical Physics, no. 43, Cambridge University Press, 1953.  
 Peter J. Hilton, Shaun Wylie, Homology theory: An introduction to algebraic topology, Cambridge University Press, New York, 1960.  
 Peter Hilton, Homotopy theory and duality, Gordon and Breach, New York-London-Paris, 1965  
 H.B. Griffiths and P.J. Hilton, "A Comprehensive Textbook of Classical Mathematics", Van Nostrand Reinhold, London, 1970, 
 Peter J. Hilton, Guido Mislin, Joe Roitberg, Localization of nilpotent groups and spaces, North-Holland Publishing Co., Amsterdam-Oxford, 1975.  
 Peter Hilton, Jean Pedersen, Build your own polyhedra. Second edition, Dale Seymour Publications, Palo Alto, 1994. 
 Peter Hilton, Derek Holton, Jean Pedersen, Mathematical reflections: In a room with many mirrors. Corrected edition, Undergraduate Texts in Mathematics, Springer-Verlag, New York, 1996. 
 Peter J. Hilton, Urs Stammbach, A course in homological algebra. Second edition, Graduate Texts in Mathematics, vol 4, Springer-Verlag, New York, 1997.  
 Hans Walser, 99 Points of Intersection, translated by Peter Hilton and Jean Pedersen, MAA Spectrum, Mathematical Association of America, 2006. 
 Peter Hilton, Derek Holton, Jean Pedersen, Mathematical vistas: From a room with many windows, Undergraduate Texts in Mathematics, Springer-Verlag, New York, 2010. 
 Peter Hilton, Jean Pedersen, A mathematical tapestry: Demonstrating the beautiful unity of mathematics, Cambridge University Press, Cambridge, 2010.

References

External links
 
 
 

1923 births
2010 deaths
20th-century British mathematicians
21st-century British mathematicians
Topologists
People educated at St Paul's School, London
Alumni of The Queen's College, Oxford
Bletchley Park people
Academics of the Victoria University of Manchester
Academics of the University of Birmingham
State University of New York faculty
Cornell University faculty
Binghamton University faculty
Courant Institute of Mathematical Sciences faculty